This is a list of Saints, Blesseds, Venerables, and Servants of God who were born in, lived in, died in, or visited Europe.

Lists of saints by country or region
 List of Breton saints
 List of Catalonian saints
 List of Cornish saints
 List of Hungarian saints
 List of saints of Iceland
 List of saints of Ireland
 List of Northumbrian saints
 List of saints of Poland
 List of Russian saints
 List of Scandinavian saints
 List of Serbian saints
 List of Swedish saints
 List of Welsh saints

Saints
 St. Alphonsus Ligouri, Italian priest
 St. Barbara (Yakovleva), Russian nun
 St. Benedict Joseph Labre, French mendicant
 St. Benedict Menni, French father
 St. Bernard Due Van Vo, Vietnamese martyr
 St. Bernadette Soubirous, French nun
 St. Bidzina Cholokashvili, Georgian Christian martyr
 St. Bonifacia Rodríguez y Castro, Spanish nun
 St. Callistus Caravario, Italian martyr
 St. Clement Mary Hofbauer, Moravian hermit
 St. Cuthbert Mayne, British martyr
 St. Didace Pelletier (fr), French Canadian father
 St. Dietrich Bonhoeffer, German theologian
 St. Domenico Savio, Child of God
 St. Edith Stein, Polish
 St. Ekvtime Takaishvili, Georgian historian
 St. Euphrosinia Kolyupanovskaya, Russian nun
 St. Ezechiele Ramin, Italian father
 St. Gabriel Urgebadze, Georgian Orthodox monk
 St. Gemma Galgani, saint
 St. Gerard Majella, Italian priest
 St. Grigol Peradze, Ukrainian artist and priest
 St. Hyacintha Mariscotti, nun
 St. Ignatius Bryanchaninov, Russian archbishop
 St. Ilia Chavchavadze, Georgian writer
 St. Ivone Faustino Guirengane, Mozambican martyr
 St. Jacinto Yaguachi, Polish/Italian priest
 St. Jadwiga of Poland, princess
 St. Jan Sarkander, Czech-Polish Roman Catholic priest
 St. Joan of Arc, Saint
 St. John Paul II, Pope
 St. John Baptist Yi, Korean Christian martyr
 St. John Vianney, French priest
 St. Josaphat Kuntsevych, Polish/Lithuanian Monk
 St. Joseph Freinademetz, Austrian Roman Catholic priest
 St. Julie Billart, French religious leader
 St. Kakutsa Cholokashvili, soldier
 St. Katarzyna Ostrogska, Russian princess
 St. Laurent Imbert, Korean martyr
 St. Magdalena of Canossa, Spanish figure
 St. Malgorzata Wiewiorra, Polish martyr
 St. Marcellin Champagnat, French teacher
 St. Margaret Mary Alacoque, French nun
 St. Maria Goretti, Italian martyr
 St. Marko Krizin, Croatian Roman Catholic priest
 St. Mary Euphrasia Pelletier, French nun
 St. Maximilian Kolbe, Polish priest
 St. Metrophanes, Chi Sung, Chinese Eastern Orthodox monk
 St. Mother Teresa, Roman Catholic nun
 St. Mutien-Marie Wiaux, French priest
 St. Orest Kiprensky, Russian bishop
 St. Padre Pio, Italian father
 St. Paisius Velichkovsky, Ukrainian saint
 St. Palackal Thoma, Indian/Italian priest
 St. Paschal Baylon, Saint
 St. Pauline of the Agonizing Heart of Jesus, Austrian nun
 St. Peregrine Laziosi, Italian saint
 St. Philippus Zheng Zhihe, martyr
 St. Philaret Drozdov, Russian archbishop
 St. Princess Olga Paley, Princess
 St. Salomone Leclercq, French priest
 St. Solomonia Saburova, wife of Prince Vasili III
 St. Sophia Olelkovich Radziwill, Lithuanian Orthodox saint
 St. Stephen Hungarian Catholic Saint
 St. Tekle Haymanot, Greek priest
 St. Theophylactos Papathanasopoulos, Greek bishop
 St. Théophane Vénard, Vietnamese martyr
 St. Titus Brandsma, Dutch friar
 St. Vicenta María López i Vicuña, Spanish martyr
 St. Xenia of Saint Petersburg, Patron saint
 St. Yegor Chekryakovsky, Russian priest
 St. Zygmunt Gorazdowski, Polish Roman Catholic priest

Blesseds
 Bl. Absalom Jones, priest
 Bl. Adrienne von Speyr, theologian
 Bl. Aldo Blundo, Child of God
 Bl. Aldo Marcozzi, Child of God
 Bl. Alexei Nikolaevich Romanov, Child of God
 Bl. Alix Le Clerc, nun
 Bl. Anastasia Yi Bong-Geum, Korean martyr
 Bl. Anna Kolesárová, Child of God
 Bl. Antoine Chevrier, French missionary
 Bl. Nikolaevna Romanova, teenager of God
 Bl. Anastazy Jakub Pankiewicz, Polish priest
 Bl. Anatalie Mukashema, martyr
 Bl. Annunciata Astoria Cocchetti, Italian nun
 Bl. Arcangela Filippelli, Child of God
 Bl. Archduchess Adelheid of Austria, archduchess
 Bl. Artémides Zatti, Italian priest
 Bl. Ascension Sanchez Sanchez, Child of God
 Bl. Ascensión Nicol y Goñi, Spanish nun
 Bl. Assunta Marchetti, laywoman
 Bl. August Czartoryski, priest
 Bl. Ayman Louka Zakairia, martyr
 Bl. Augustin-Etienne Bourry, martyr
 Bl. B. Prabhudass, young bishop
 Bl. Baldji Oghlou Ohannes, martyr
 Bl. Balthazar Kagayama Hanzaemon, martyr
 Bl. Benedictus Kim Ch'i Ho, martyr
 Bl. Baptista Varani, Italian nun
 Bl. Basil Moreau, French bishop
 Bl. Bernardyna Maria Jabłońska, nun
 Bl. Bernhard Lehner, martyr
 Bl. Bolesława Lament, Polish nun
 Bl. Boniface Zukowski, young Polish martyr
 Bl. Bonaventura Gran, priest
 Bl. Bonaventura Tornielli, Italian
 Bl. Bronisław Kostkowski, young deacon
 Bl. Bronisław Markiewicz, Polish priest
 Bl. Brusznyai Árpád, Hungarian martyr
 Bl. Buenaventura Gabika Etxebarria-Gerrikabeitia, young priest
 Bl. Carlo Acutis, Child of God
 Bl. Cecilia Eusepi, teenager of God
 Bl. Cecília Schelingová, Slovak nun
 Bl. Ceferino Giménez Malla, Spanish priest
 Bl. Ceferino Namuncurá, teenager of God
 Bl. Celeste Morilleau, martyr
 Bl. Celeste-Victoire Boisseleau, child
 Bl. Celine Borzecka, Russian nun
 Bl. Chiara Badano, Italian teenager of God
 Bl. Ciriaco María Sancha y Hervás, Spanish priest
 Bl. Costanza Starace, Italian nun
 Bl. Coleta Meléndez Torres, teenager of God
 Bl. Colomba Gabriel, Ukrainian nun
 Bl. Columba Marmion, Irish
 Bl. Concepcion Rodriguez Fernandez, martyr
 Bl. Cescencia Anazawa, martyr
 Bl. Đinh Xuân Quảng, politician
 Bl. Dionysius Fugixima], martyr
 Bl. Dmitry Ivanovich, martyr
 Bl. Domingo Iturrate Zubero, Spanish priest
 Bl. Edmund Bojanowski, Polish priest
 Bl. Edmund Ignatius Rice, Irish priest
 Bl. Edward Poppe, Belgian priest
 Bl. Elena Spirgevičiūte, martyr
 Bl. Ellen Organ, Child of God
 Bl. Elizabeth Chong-Chong Hye, martyr
 Bl. Elyas Yunes, martyr
 Bl. Engelmar Unzeitig, German priest
 Bl. Etienne Beriau, child
 Bl. Eulalia M'a' Gabriel Mokhosi 
 Bl. Eusebia Palomino Yenes, Spanish religious figure
 Bl. Ezekiel Katzenellenbogen, martyr
 Bl. Faustino Perez-Manglano, Servant of God
 Bl. Fidelis Chojnacki, martyr
 Bl. Flavianus Michael Malke, Turkish priest
 Bl. Florentine and Barnabe Castillejos], twin martyrs
 Bl. Frédéric Janssoone, French priest
 Bl. Geuregh Ohannes Zehrobian, martyr
 Bl. Gaetana Nastasi, Child of God
 Bl. Giacinto Longhin, Bishop of Trevino
 Bl. Giulia Crostarosa, Italian nun
 Bl. Grzegorz Bolesław Frąckowiak, Polish priest
 Bl. Guy Pierre de Fontgalland, Child of God
 Bl. Hanna Helena Chrzanowska, Polish nurse
 Bl. Havryil Blazhovskyi, priest
 Bl. Hendrina Stenmanns, German nun
 Bl. Hiacynta Lula, martyr
 Bl. Hieronymus von Colloredo, bishop
 Bl. Hildegard Burjan, German mother
 Bl. Hieronymus Kim Yi-Sik, martyr
 Bl. Honorat da Biała, Polish priest
 Bl. Hryhoriy Khomyshyn, Ukrainian Roman Catholic bishop
 Bl. Hryhoriy Lakota, Ukrainian auxiliary bishop
 Bl. Hyacinthe-Marie Cormier, French priest
 Bl. Ignacy Kłopotowski, Polish priest
 Bl. Ignacego Odriozola Zabalia, martyr
 Bl. Ignatius Maloyan, Turkish priest
 Bl. Ikuta Chōkō, young soldier
 Bl. Innocenzo da Berzo, friar
 Bl. Inácio de Azevedo, Portuguese sailor
 Bl. Ioane Zedazneli, martyr
 Bl. Ioannes Baptista Wu Mantang, martyr
 Bl. Ion Costist, Roman Catholic
 Bl. Iosephus Gang Man-Su, martyr
 Bl. Ioannes Mukuno Chozaburo, teenager
 Bl. Ippolito Galantini, Italian teacher
 Bl. Isabella Chimienti, nun
 Bl. Ise Tsillkneli, young martyr
 Bl. Istvan Kaszap, Child of God
 Bl. Itala Mela, Italian Roman Catholic
 Bl. Jadwiga Dzido, Holocaust survivor
 Bl. Jacques-Désiré Laval, French priest
 Bl. Janina Szymkowiak, Polish nun
 Bl. Januarius Maria Sarnelli, Italian priest
 Bl. Jarena Lee, nun
 Bl. Jarogniew Wojciechowski, Polish martyr
 Bl. Jeanne-Germaine Castang, Child of God
 Bl. Jeanne-Marie Kegelin, martyr
 Bl. Jerzy Popiełuszko, Polish priest
 Bl. Jerzy Powiertowski, martyr
 Bl. Johane Maranke, Catholic
 Bl. Johann Nepomuk von Tschiderer zu Gleifheim, Bishop of Trent
 Bl. Johannes Ludovicus Paquay, Belgian priest
 Bl. John-Baptiste Nguyễn Bửu Đồng, young priest
 Bl. Josaphata Hordashevska, Roman Catholic sister
 Bl. Joseph-Outhay Phongphumi, child
 Bl. Josefina Vilaseca, Spanish Child of God
 Bl. Juan Nepomuceno Zegrí Moreno, Spanish priest
 Bl. Jury Kashyra, Belarusian priest
 Bl. János Brenner, Hungarian priest
 Bl. Jurgis Matulaitis-Matulevičius, Lithuanian priest
 Bl. Juana María Condesa Lluch, Spanish nun
 Bl. Kanoko Okamoto, Japanese buddhist
 Bl. Karolina Kózka, Child of God
 Bl. Ladislao Luis, teenager
 Bl. Laurentius Bai Xiaoman, martyr
 Bl. Leonella Sgorbati, Italian nun
 Bl. Leokadia Matuszewska, young nun
 Bl. Lettehauriat Ghebregziabiher, Turkish nun
 Bl. Libânia do Carmo Galvão Mexia de Moura Telles de Albuquerque, nun
 Bl. László Batthyány-Strattmann, Hungarian aristocrat
 Bl. Lojze Grozde, German martyr
 Bl. Louis-Zéphirin Moreau, French priest
 Bl. Lucrezia Elena Cevoli, Professed religious
 Bl. Ludovica Albertoni, Italian nun
 Bl. Ludovicus Sasada, Italian martyr
 Bl. Magdalena Hayashida, martyr
 Bl. Maisam Pho Inpeng, martyr
 Bl. Franciszka Siedliska, Polish laywoman
 Bl. Magdalena Kade, Czech nun
 Bl. Maria Orsola Bussone, Child of God
 Bl. Maria Gabriella Sagheddu
 Bl. Manuela de Jesús Arias Espinosa, Mexican nun
 Bl. Margit Bogner, nun
 Bl. Maria Lichtenegger, nun
 Bl. Mateo Correa Magallanes, Spanish martyr
 Bl. Maddalena Caterina Morano, Spanish nun
 Bl. Marcel Callo, French Roman Catholic
 Bl. Marcelline Jayakody, father
 Bl. Margaretha Flesch, German nun
 Bl. Marija Petković, Croatian nun
 Bl. Marianna Biernacka, Polish martyr
 Bl. Małgorzata Szewczyk, Polish nun
 Bl. Mary of the Divine Heart, German nun
 Bl. Mary of the Passion, French nun
 Bl. Marytė Melnikaitė, martyr
 Bl. Maysoon Ghatas Fahmy, Child martyr
 Bl. Mercè Prat i Prat, Spanish nun
 Bl. Mieczyslawa Kowalska, young nun
 Bl. Mikael Ulumboeli, young martyr
 Bl. Miroslav Bulešić, Croatian priest
 Bl. Muktabai Dixit, writer
 Bl. Mutatesia Leonelli, writer
 Bl. Giulia Valle, nun
 Bl. Natalia Tułasiewicz, Polish teacher and martyr of World War II
 Bl. Nazju Falzon, Maltese cleric
 Bl. Nunzio Sulprizio, priest
 Bl. Nykyta Budka, Ukrainian clergyman
 Bl. Odoardo Focherini, Italian priest
 Bl. Ogasawara Gonnosuke, martyr
 Bl. Olena Hlibovyts'ka, nun
 Bl. Omgba Bissogo, soldier
 Bl. Otto Neururer, Austrian priest
 Bl. Panacea De' Muzzi, martyr
 Bl. Paola Renata Carboni, teenager
 Bl. Patricius Dong, martyr
 Bl. Pavel Djidjov, theologian
 Bl. Pavel Peter Gojdič, Slovak priest
 Bl. Peregrina Mogas Fontcuberta, Spanish nun
 Bl. Petar Barbarić, martyr
 Bl. Pétrus Ky, young soldier
 Bl. Pierina Morosini, Italian teenager of God
 Bl. Placid Olofsson, Hungarian priest
 Bl. Placide Viel, French nun
 Bl. Práxedes Mateo Sagasta, Spanish bishop
 Bl. Princess Vera Constantinovna of Russia, princess
 Bl. Prokopios Lazaridis, Turkish archbishop
 Bl. Purificacion Ximenez y Ximenez, young nun
 Bl. Rachelina Ambrosini, Child of God
 Bl. Regina Protmann, Polish nurse
 Bl. Rhoel Gallardo, priest
 Bl. Robert Naoussi, martyr
 Bl. Roman Lysko, Ukrainian priest
 Bl. Romanua Anazawa Matsujiro, young person
 Bl. Roza Robota, martyr
 Bl. Ryūnosuke Akutagawa, writer
 Bl. Samia Abdel-Messhis Mahrous, teenager
 Bl. Saozinha de Alenquer, young nun
 Bl. Sára Salkaházi, Hungarian teacher
 Bl. Santos Franco Sánchez, martyr
 Bl. Savina Petrilli, Italian nun
 Bl. Seraphina Sforza, Italian nun
 Bl. Shimun XVI Yohannan, martyr
 Bl. Sibell Lygon, Sister of Mary Lagon
 Bl. Silvio Dissegna, martyr
 Bl. Szilárd Bogdánffy, Hungarian auxiliary priest
 Bl. Stanislaus Kostka, Child of God 
 Bl. Tarsykiya Matskiv, Ukrainian nun
 Bl. Terezija Banja, Polish nun
 Bl. Theodore Romzha, Ukrainian priest
 Bl. Thoj Xyooj Paj Lug, martyr
 Bl. Thomas Khamphuene Inthirath, martyr
 Bl. Thurston Hunt, British martyr
 Bl. Titus Zeman, Slovak priest
 Bl. Trần Phú, politician and religious
 Bl. Ulrico Sarti, martyr
 Bl. Ulrika, Ukrainian nun
 Bl. Ursula Yamamoto, child
 Bl.  Valentine Uwingabire, martyr
 Bl. Victoire Brielle, laywoman
 Bl. Victoria Díez Bustos de Molina, friar
 Bl. Vasyl Velychkovsky, Ukrainian priest
 Bl. Ventura Martin Tejerizo], Spanish martyr
 Bl. Veronique Minaud, martyr
 Bl. Vsevolod Ivanovich, prince
 Bl. Walter Elias Chango Rondeau, martyr
 Bl. Wenceslau Claris Vilaregut, martyr
 Bl. Weronika Narmontowicz, nun
 Bl. Wojiech Piwowarczyk, priest
 Bl. Yakym Senkivskyi, Ukrainian blessed
 Bl. Yekaterina Gagarina, countess
 Bl. Yekuno Amlak, young emperor
 Bl. Zbigniew Stralkowski, martyr
 Bl. Zdenka Cecília Schelingová, nun
 Bl. Zefirino Agostini, Italian priest
 Bl. Zeinab Alif, nun
 Bl. Zofia Czeska, Polish religious figure
 Bl. Zoltán Meszlényi, Hungarian priest
 Bl. Zenon Iqaltoeli, Young martyr

Venerables
 Ven. Alexandre Toé, French/African priest
 Ven. Alcide de Gasperi, Hungarian priest
 Ven. Andrey Sheptytsky, Metropolitan archbishop
 Ven. Annalena Tonelli, religious spokesperson
 Ven. Anne de Guigné, Child of God
 Ven. Anne de Xainctonge, French venerable
 Ven. Antonietta Meo, young Child of God
 Ven. Antonio Augusto Intreccialagli, archbishop
 Ven. Beda Chang, Chinese/European father
 Ven. Bodi Maria Magdolna, Child of God
 Ven. Benoîte Rencurel, French nun
 Ven. Bonaventura Duda, Croatian priest
 Ven. Celestina Bottego, Italian venerable
 Ven. Concepción Cabrera de Armida, Italian/Mexican writer
 Ven. Consuelo Ultrilla Lozano, nun
 Ven. Delia Tetreault, French nun
 Ven. Edvige Carboni, Italian Catholic
 Ven. Elena of Montenegro, princess
 Ven. Endre Bajcsy-Zsilinszky, priest
 Ven. Exupérien Mas, French teacher
 Ven. Feliksa Kozłowska, Matezcka
 Ven. Felix Mary Ghebreamlak, Italian/Eritrean priest
 Ven. Filomena Ferrer Galceran, martyr
 Ven. Francesc Xavier Butinyà i Hospital, Spanish teacher
 Ven. Guadalupe Ortiz de Landázuri Fernández de Heredia, Spanish doctor
 Ven. Hedwig Borzecka, Polish mother
 Ven. Ida Mari, Italian writer
 Ven. Ignazia Verzeri, Benedictine nun
 Ven. Ignatius Mrak, Slovenian priest
 Ven. Innocenzo Leonelli, soldier, hermit
 Ven. Isidoro Zorzano Ledesma, Spanish Opus Dei member
 Ven. Jan Bula, Czech priest
 Ven. Janez Frančišek Gnidovec, Slovenian bishop
 Ven. Joaquina Maria Mercedes Barcelo Pages, Spanish nun
 Ven. Klymentiy Sheptytsky, Bishop
 Ven. Kuys Varvara, religious figure
 Ven. Margherita Occhiena, mother of John Bosco
 Ven. Matteo Ricci, S.J., Italian priest
 Ven. Mkhitar Sebastatsi, Armenian monk
 Ven. Montserrat Grases, Spanish Member of Opus Dei
 Ven. Nano Nagle, Irish venerable
 Ven. Pelágio Sauter, German priest
 Ven. Queen Emma of Hawaii, European/Hawaiian queen
 Ven. Romuald Jałbrzykowski, Polish priest
 Ven. Sante Spessotto, Mexican/Italian priest
 Ven. Théodelinde Bourcin-Dubouché, French nun
 Ven. Vital-Justin Grandin, French reverend
 Ven. Zygmunt Łoziński, Belarusian bishop

References

Europe